Musa violascens is a species of wild banana (genus Musa), native to Peninsular Malaysia. It is placed in section Callimusa (now including the former section Australimusa), members of which have a diploid chromosome number of 2n = 20.

References

violascens
Endemic flora of Peninsular Malaysia
Plants described in 1893